Boma ya Ulanga (Ulanga) is a village in Ulanga District, Morogoro Region of central Tanzania. It is on the west bank of the Ulanga River.

Notes

Populated places in Morogoro Region